Robert Grieve Harrison (1911–1950), sometimes known as Bertie Harrison, was a Scottish footballer who played as an inside left for Airdrieonians, Hamilton Academical and Rangers.

He played in the 1935 Scottish Cup Final for Accies, scoring his side's goal in a 2–1 defeat to Rangers, and he was also selected for the Scottish Football League XI on two occasions (and a reserve for the full Scotland team during his spell in Hamilton. His career was curtailed by World War II, in which he served in the Royal Air Force. Health problems led to his withdrawal from the RAF and his retirement from sport (he had also been a keen golfer).

References

1911 births
1950 deaths
Footballers from Greenock
Association football inside forwards
Scottish Football League players
Royal Air Force personnel of World War II
Scottish Junior Football Association players
Scottish footballers
Hamilton Academical F.C. players
Port Glasgow Athletic Juniors F.C. players
Airdrieonians F.C. (1878) players
Rangers F.C. players
Scottish Football League representative players